Yutaka Ishii (27 February 1920 – between 1942 and 1945) was a Japanese baseball player who appeared as a first baseman in the Japanese Baseball League. Entering military service in 1942, he was killed in action during the Second World War.

References

1920 births
1940s deaths
Sportspeople from Aichi Prefecture
Date of death missing
Place of death missing
Japanese baseball players
Nishitetsu Baseball Club players
Japanese military personnel of World War II
Japanese military personnel killed in World War II